Judith A. Cory is a make-up artist. She worked on 58 films from 1967 to 2005.

Oscar nominations
Both nominations were in the category of Best Makeup.

1994 Academy Awards-Nominated for Forrest Gump, nomination shared with Hallie D'Amore and Daniel C. Striepeke. Lost to Ed Wood.
1993 Academy Awards-Nominated for Schindler's List, nomination shared with Christina Smith and Matthew W. Mungle. Lost to Mrs. Doubtfire.

Selected filmography

Meet the Fockers (2004)
The Matrix Revolutions (2003)
The Matrix Reloaded (2003)
Evolution (2001)
The Haunting (1999)
The Lost World: Jurassic Park (1997)
Forrest Gump (1994)
Schindler's List (1993)
Hook (1991)

References

External links

Make-up artists
Living people
Year of birth missing (living people)
Place of birth missing (living people)